David John Constantine (born 1944) is an English poet, author and translator.

Background
Born in Salford, Constantine read Modern Languages at Wadham College, Oxford, and was a Fellow of The Queen's College, Oxford, until 2000, when he became a Supernumerary Fellow. He lectured in German at Durham University from 1969 to 1981 and at Oxford University from 1981 to 2000.

He was the co-editor of the literary journal Modern Poetry in Translation. Along with the Irish poet Bernard O'Donoghue, he is commissioning editor of the Oxford Poets imprint of Carcanet Press and has been a chief judge for the TS Eliot Prize.

His collections of poetry include Madder, Watching for Dolphins, Caspar Hauser, The Pelt of Wasps, Something for the Ghosts, Collected Poems and Nine Fathom Deep. He is a translator of Hölderlin, Brecht, Goethe, Kleist, Michaux and Jaccottet.

In 2015, the film 45 Years, based on Constantine's short story "In Another Country", enjoyed critical acclaim. The film stars Tom Courtenay and Charlotte Rampling. Rampling was nominated for an Academy Award for her performance. 

Constantine is also author of two novels, Davies and The Life Writer, a biography, Fields of Fire: A Life of Sir William Hamilton, and multiple collections of short stories, including Back at the Spike, the highly acclaimed Under the Dam (2005) and The Shieling (2009) and the award-winning Tea at the Midland and Other Stories.

Awards and honours
2020 Queen's Gold Medal for Poetry
2013 Frank O'Connor International Short Story Award, Tea at the Midland and Other Stories
2010 BBC National Short Story Award, "Tea at the Midland"
2010 Frank O'Connor International Short Story Award, shortlist, The Shieling
2003 Popescu Prize, translation of Hans Magnus Enzensberger's Lighter than Air
2002 Whitbread Poetry Prize, shortlist, Watching for Dolphins

Bibliography
 A Brightness to Cast Shadows (1980), Bloodaxe Books, 
 Watching for the Dolphins (1983)
 Early Greek Travellers and the Hellenic Ideal (1984)
 Davies (1985)
 Selected Poems (1991)
 Back at the Spike (1994)
 Caspar Hauser (1994)
 The Pelt of Wasps (1998)
 Something for the Ghosts (2002)
 Under the Dam (2005)
 The Shieling (2009)
 Tea at the Midland and Other Stories (2012)
 Poetry: The Literary Agenda (2013)
 In Another Country: Selected Stories (2015)
 The Dressing-Up Box and Other Stories (2019)

Reviews
 Hearn, Sheila G. (1981), review of A Brightness to Cast Shadows, in Murray, Glen (ed.), Cencrastus No. 5, Summer 1981, pp. 51

References

External links
 Profile at the British Council
 Profile and recordings at the Poetry Archive
 David Constantine, Comma Press]

1944 births
Living people
Fellows of The Queen's College, Oxford
Fellows of the Royal Society of Literature
English male poets